Sigita is a Lithuanian and Latvian feminine given name. The associated name day is July 31.

Notable people named Sigita 
Sigita Burbienė (born 1954), Lithuanian politician
 (born 1975), Lithuanian dancer
Sigita Strečen (born 1958), Lithuanian handball player

References 

Latvian feminine given names
Lithuanian feminine given names
Feminine given names